The individual dressage at the 2018 FEI World Equestrian Games in Tryon, United States was held at Tryon International Equestrian Center from September 11 to September 23, 2018.

Germany's Isabell Werth won the gold medal in the Grand Prix Special. Laura Graves representing United States won a silver medal in the Grand Prix Special and the title defender Charlotte Dujardin won bronze in the Special, her first individual medal at a major championship with another horse then Valegro.

Competition format

The team and individual dressage competitions used the same results. Dressage had three phases but ended in two. The first phase was the Grand Prix. The top 30 individuals advanced to the second phase, the Grand Prix Special where the first individual medals were awarded. The Individual Grand Prix Freestyle was cancelled due to Hurricane Florence.

Judges
The Grand Prix and Grand Prix Special were assessed by seven judges. The president of the ground jury was the Anne Gribbons from The United States of America. Her colleagues were Katrina Wüst from Germany, Andrew Ralph Gardner from Great Britain, Mariëtte Sanders van Gansewinkel from The Netherlands, Annette Fransen Iacobaeus from Sweden, Susan Hoevenaars from Australia and Hans-Christian Matthiesen from Denmark. Thomas Lang from Austria was the reserve judge, while Cara Whitham from Canada was the Technical Delegate.

Schedule

Results

References

2018 in equestrian